Giuliano Sonzogni (born 2 February 1949) is an Italian football manager.

Previously he managed the Bulgarian football club Botev Vratsa.

References

1949 births
Living people
Italian football managers
A.C. Ponte San Pietro Isola S.S.D. managers
Hellas Verona F.C. managers
U.S. Salernitana 1919 managers
A.S. Siracusa managers
S.S. Fidelis Andria 1928 managers
A.S. Gualdo Calcio managers
Cosenza Calcio managers
FC Lugano managers
Palermo F.C. managers
U.S. Avellino 1912 managers
S.P.A.L. managers
A.C. Monza managers
U.S. Siracusa managers
U.S. Alessandria Calcio 1912 managers
Italian expatriate football managers
Expatriate football managers in Bulgaria
Italian expatriate sportspeople in Bulgaria